Rear Admiral Joy Kobla Amedume served in the Ghana Navy. He served as Chief of Naval Staff of the Ghana Navy from June 1977 to June 1979. He was appointed twice to this position first from May 1972 to January 1973 and then from June 1977 to June 1979.

Arrest and execution
He was arrested in June 1979 when Junior Officers of the Ghana armed forces staged a coup d'état on June 4, 1979, and released Flight Lieutenant J J Rawlings who had been arrested  and was on trial for attempting a coup on May 15, 1979. The officers then formed the Armed Forces Revolutionary Council (AFRC) and made JJ Rawlings their leader. Under the aegis of the AFRC 8 senior Military Offices including two former Heads of States as well as Rear Admiral Joy Amedume were put on military trial and executed on June 26, 1979. In 2001, their bodies were released to their families for reburial.

References

Ghanaian military personnel
Ghana Navy personnel
Chiefs of Naval Staff (Ghana)
Executed Ghanaian people
People executed by Ghana by firing squad